The Castorland Company was organized in Paris, France in 1792 as the Compagnie de New York -- The New York Company -- to invest in lands in north and northwestern New York. Land in Lewis County, New York, part of the Macomb's Purchase, was bought from William Constable.  Settlers arrived in 1796 and within four years the colony had failed.  The transplanted French people, unfit for the vigorous open life and hard work of the Frontier, preferred more civilized communities.

References

Further reading
 Simon Desjardins, Pierre Pharoux. John A. Gallucci (Tr.). Castorland Journal: An Account of the Exploration and Settlement of Northern New York State by French Émigrés in the Years 1793 to 1797. (Cornell University Press, 2010.)
 Edith Pilcher. Castorland: French Refugees in the Western Adirondacks, 1793–1814 (Harrison, NY.: Harbor Hills Books, 1985). 
 Dictionary of American History by James Truslow Adams, New York: Charles Scribner's Sons, 1940.

French North America
History of the Thirteen Colonies
Companies established in 1792
French companies established in 1792